Hendrik Floris Cohen (born Haarlem, Netherlands, 1 July 1946) is a historian of science.

Life 
Cohen studied history at the University of Leiden, receiving a Ph.D. in 1974. He is a professor in the Comparative History of Science at the University of Utrecht. Cohen is the brother of politician Job Cohen and son of the historian Dolf Cohen.

In 2008, Cohen was awarded the Dutch "Eureka" prize for the best book of the year that makes science accessible to a wide audience.

Bibliography 
 The Scientific Revolution: A Historiographical Inquiry, University of Chicago Press 1994, 680 pages, 
 Quantifying Music: The Science of Music at the First Stage of Scientific Revolution 1580-1650, Springer 1984, 332 pages, 
 How Modern Science Came into the World: Four Civilizations, One 17th-Century Breakthrough, Amsterdam University Press, 2011

References

External links 

 

1946 births
Living people
Historians of science
20th-century Dutch historians
Writers from Haarlem
Leiden University alumni
Academic staff of the University of Twente
Academic staff of Utrecht University
Dutch Jews
21st-century Dutch historians